The Volkswagen Group E platform was a series of automobile platforms shared among multiple marques of sport utility vehicles (SUVs) (4x4s in the European market).  It was co-developed by Volkswagen Group and Porsche AG.  All platform users shared the Volkswagen Bratislava Plant in Slovakia, with the Porsche Cayenne having final assembly at the Porsche plant at Leipzig.

PL71 platform vehicles
Volkswagen Touareg (Typ 7L) (2002 - 2010)
Porsche Cayenne (Typ 9PA) (2002 - 2010)
Audi Q7 (Typ 4L) (2005 - 2015)

PL72 platform vehicles
Volkswagen Touareg (Typ 7P) (2010 - 2018)
Porsche Cayenne (Typ 92A) (2010 - 2018)

References

External links
Volkswagen Group corporate website

E platform